Marija Knežević (born 29 December 1963) is a Serbian poet, fiction writer, essayist, literary translator and Professor of literature.

Knežević was born in Belgrade, Serbia, in 1963. She graduated from Belgrade University with a degree in Comparative Literature and Theory of Literature. She later completed her M.A. degree at Michigan State University where she also taught from 1996 to 2000. She wrote a column for the Politika newspaper.

Selected bibliography

Poetry 
Her poetry includes:
 Elegiac Advice to Julia, BIGZ; Belgrade. (1994)
 Things for Personal Use, Prosveta; Belgrade. (1994)
 The Age of Salome, Prosveta; Belgrade. (1996)
 My Other You, Vajat; Belgrade. (2001)

Prose 
Her collection of proses include:

 Dog Food, novel published by Matica srpska, Novi Sad (1989)
 Querida, e-mail correspondence with Anika Krstić from Belgrade during bombing of Yugoslavia in 1999. Vajat; Belgrade (2001)
 The Book of Longing, Slobodna izdanja Slobodana Mašića; Belgrade. (2003)
 Das Buch vom Fehlen, bilingual, Serbian and German edition; Wieser Verlag, translation into German: Goran Novaković, Vienna. (2004)
 Ekaterini , (2005). Translation into English: Will Firth, Istros Books, London; England. (2013)
 Fabula rasa, the work on the book financed by Austrian "KulturKontakt", the author's edition; Belgrade. (2008)
 Auto, Agora,; Zrenjanin. (2017)

Awards 
 The Đura Jakšič Award, 2007, for the poetry collection In tactum
 The story “Without Fear of Change” (from Fabula rasa) is included in the "Best European Fiction" edition for 2012 (Dalkey Archive Press, Illinois, US).

References

External links 
 SKD/Marija Knežević
 Agon magazine/Marija Knežević
 Knjižara.com/Marija Knežević

1963 births
Living people
Writers from Belgrade
Serbian women poets
Serbian women essayists
Serbian women short story writers
Serbian short story writers
Serbian novelists
Serbian translators
Serbian educators
University of Belgrade alumni
20th-century Serbian women writers
21st-century Serbian women writers
20th-century Serbian educators
21st-century Serbian educators
Serbian women novelists